The El Dorado Correctional Facility (abbreviated EDCF), is a maximum security prison located in Prospect Township, Butler County, Kansas east of El Dorado, United States.

EDCF is the location of the Kansas Department of Corrections (KDOC) Reception and Diagnostic Unit (RDU), which processes every male inmate when they are received into custody. RDU helps determine the inmate's custody level, mental health classification, and educational program needs before he is assigned to a facility.

EDCF has two general population cellhouses and one medium security dormitory. EDCF is administratively linked to two minimum security units, formerly "honor camps", one in El Dorado and one in Toronto, Kansas. In 2009, the announcement was made that the state would be closing both minimum security units, due to budget constraints. As of 2015, medium and minimum security units in Oswego were administratively part of EDCF.

EDCF is also the location of the state's de facto death row. Inmates sentenced to death are housed in administrative segregation ("AdSeg"). The state currently has nine inmates on death row. Executions, however, take place at the Lansing Correctional Facility (LCF) in Lansing.  The state has not had an execution since June 22, 1965, when spree killers George York and James Latham were hanged there.

History
The El Dorado Correctional Facility was established in 1991. It was built in response to a federal mandate to ease over-crowding at the state's other two maximum security prisons.  Expansion in 2001 brought two new general population cellhouses. The facility is expected to expand in the future.

The first escape in facility history occurred on October 28, 2007. Inmates Jesse Bell and Steven Ford escaped with the assistance of former corrections officer, Amber Goff. The three were apprehended in Grants, New Mexico, less than three days later. Bell and Ford were arrested in an apartment complex parking lot. Goff was found asleep in the driver's seat of a car parked in the driveway of a nearby vacant Grants home; a stolen handgun was found under a newspaper next to her.

In recent years, the state has considered relocating executions from the Lansing Correctional Facility to the El Dorado Correctional Facility.

Notable inmates
 Reginald and Jonathan Carr – brothers were convicted of killing five people in a December 2000 crime spree dubbed the "Wichita Massacre" and sentenced to death. Their death sentences have been overturned and reinstated again.
 Richard Grissom - a convicted serial killer who murdered three women in 1989. Their bodies have never been found.
 Frazier Glenn Miller Jr. – white supremacist terrorist who killed three people in 2014. Sentenced to death. Died of natural causes in 2021.
 Martin Priest – a convicted murderer and possible serial killer.
 Dennis Rader – a convicted serial killer also known as BTK, who murdered ten people from 1974 to 1991.  He eluded capture until 2005.  Rader pled guilty and was sentenced to ten consecutive life sentences.  Rader nicknamed himself "BTK", an initialism reflecting his modus operandi of binding, torturing, and killing his victims.
 John Robinson – a convicted serial killer, con man, embezzler, kidnapper, and forger.  He was found guilty in 2003 of three murders and was sentenced to death for two of them. He subsequently admitted responsibility for five additional homicides, and investigators fear that there might be other, undiscovered victims. Because he made contact with most of his post-1993 victims via online chat rooms, he is sometimes referred to as "the Internet's first serial killer".

References

External links
 Official website
 Kansas Prison Inmate Database - Kansas Department of Corrections

Buildings and structures in Butler County, Kansas
Prisons in Kansas
Capital punishment in Kansas
1991 establishments in Kansas